Codex Hierosolymitanus (also called the Bryennios manuscript or the Jerusalem Codex, often designated simply "H" in scholarly discourse) is an 11th-century Greek manuscript. It contains copies of a number of early Christian texts including the only complete edition of the Didache. It was written by an otherwise unknown scribe named Leo, who dated it 1056.

The codex contains the Didache, the Epistle of Barnabas, the First Epistle of Clement and the Second Epistle of Clement, the long version of the letters of Ignatius of Antioch and a list of books of the Bible following the order of John Chrysostom. 

It was discovered in 1873 by Philotheos Bryennios, the metropolitan of Nicomedia, in the collection of the Jerusalem Monastery of the Most Holy Sepulchre in Constantinople. He published the texts of the two familiar Epistles of Clement in 1875, overlooking the Didache, which he found when he returned to the manuscript.

Adolf Hilgenfeld used Codex Hierosolymitanus for his first printed edition of the previously almost unknown Didache in 1877.

References

External links
 Panagios Taphos 54. John Chrysostom: Synopsis of the Testaments; Apostolic Fathers. 1056 A.D. 120 f. Pg. 16 ft. Complete set of digital images
 Jerusalem, Patriarchikê bibliothêkê, Panaghiou Taphou 054 Description, List of Contents
 The New Schaff-Herzog Encyclopedia of Religious Knowledge Bryennios, Philotheos

11th-century biblical manuscripts
Hierosolymitanus
Byzantine literature
New Testament apocrypha
Publications of patristic texts